Norðfjarðargöng is a tunnel in Iceland, located in Eastern Region along Route 92. After delays, prompting protests by residents of the area, it opened on 11 November 2017. Norðfjarðargöng connects the communities of Neskaupstaður and Eskifjörður, replacing the Oddsskarðsgöng tunnel.

References

External links 
Icelandic Roads Administration  (Icelandic)

Road tunnels in Iceland
Buildings and structures in Eastern Region (Iceland)